The following outline is provided as an overview of and topical guide to Colombia:

Colombia – tropical equatorial country located in northern South America. It is the most megadiverse country in the world (per square kilometer). The majority of its urban centres are located in the highlands of the Andes mountains, but Colombian territory also encompasses Amazon rainforest, tropical grassland and both Caribbean and Pacific coastlines. Colombia is a middle power, and is the third largest economy in Latin America, and the second largest in South America.

General reference

 Pronunciation: 
 
 Common English country name:  Colombia
 Official English country name:  The Republic of Colombia
 Common endonym(s): Colombia
 Official endonym(s): República de Colombia
 Adjectival(s): Colombian
 Demonym(s): Colombian
 Etymology: Name of Colombia
 International rankings of Colombia
 ISO country codes: CO, COL, 170
 ISO region codes: See ISO 3166-2:CO
 Internet country code top-level domain: .co

Geography of Colombia 

Geography of Colombia
 Colombia is: a megadiverse country
 Location:
 Western Hemisphere, on the Equator
 South America
 Time in Colombia
 Time zone:  UTC-05
 Extreme points of Colombia
 High:  Pico Cristóbal Colón  or Pico Simón Bolívar 
 Low:  North Pacific Ocean and Caribbean Sea 0 m
 Land boundaries:  6,309 km
 2,050 km
 1,800 km
 1,644 km
 590 km
 225 km
 Coastline:  3,208 km
Caribbean Sea 1,760 km
North Pacific Ocean 1,448 km
 Population of Colombia: 44,603,000 (October 13, 2008)  - 29th most populous country

 Area of Colombia: 1,141,748 km2
 Atlas of Colombia

Environment of Colombia 

Environment of Colombia
 Climate of Colombia
 Environmental issues in Colombia
 Deforestation in Colombia
 Natural hazards in Colombia
 Ecoregions in Colombia
 Renewable energy in Colombia
 Geology of Colombia
 Protected areas of Colombia
 Archaeological sites in Colombia
 Biosphere reserves in Colombia
 National parks of Colombia
 Wildlife of Colombia
 Flora of Colombia
 Fauna of Colombia
 Birds of Colombia
 Mammals of Colombia

Natural geographic features of Colombia 
 Glaciers of Colombia
 Islands of Colombia
 Mountains of Colombia
 Volcanoes in Colombia
 Rivers of Colombia
 World Heritage Sites in Colombia

Regions of Colombia 
Regions of Colombia
 Caribbean Region of Colombia

Ecoregions of Colombia

Administrative divisions of Colombia 
Administrative divisions of Colombia
 Districts of Colombia
 Municipalities of Colombia

Districts of Colombia 

Districts of Colombia

Municipalities of Colombia 

Municipalities of Colombia
 Capital of Colombia: Bogotá
 Cities of Colombia

Demography of Colombia 
Demographics of Colombia

Government and politics of Colombia 
Politics of Colombia
 Form of government: unitary presidential welfare state
 Capital of Colombia: Bogotá
 Elections in Colombia
 Political parties in Colombia
 Political scandals of Colombia
 Security issues in Colombia
 Taxation in Colombia
 Trade unions in Colombia

Branches of government

Government of Colombia

Executive branch of the government of Colombia 

Executive Branch of Colombia
 Head of state & Head of government: President of Colombia, Vice President of Colombia
 Entities in the executive branch of Colombia
 Cabinet of Colombia
 Control Institutions in Colombia
 Office of the Comptroller General of Colombia
 Office of the Inspector General of Colombia
 Ombudsman's Office of Colombia

Legislative branch of the government of Colombia 

Legislative Branch of Colombia
 Congress of Colombia (bicameral)
 Upper house: Senate of Colombia
 Lower house: Chamber of Representatives of Colombia

Judicial branch of the government of Colombia 

Judicial Branch of Colombia
 Supreme Court of Colombia
 Constitutional Court of Colombia
 Superior Council of Judicature
 Attorney General of Colombia

Foreign relations of Colombia 

Foreign relations of Colombia
 Diplomatic missions in Colombia
 Diplomatic missions of Colombia
 Ambassador of Colombia to the United States

International organization membership 
The Republic of Colombia is a member of:

Agency for the Prohibition of Nuclear Weapons in Latin America and the Caribbean (OPANAL)
Andean Community of Nations (CAN)
Caribbean Community and Common Market (Caricom) (observer)
Caribbean Development Bank (CDB)
Central American Bank for Economic Integration (BCIE)
Food and Agriculture Organization (FAO)
Group of Three (G3)
Group of 24 (G24)
Group of 77 (G77)
Inter-American Development Bank (IADB)
International Atomic Energy Agency (IAEA)
International Bank for Reconstruction and Development (IBRD)
International Chamber of Commerce (ICC)
International Civil Aviation Organization (ICAO)
International Criminal Court (ICCt)
International Criminal Police Organization (Interpol)
International Development Association (IDA)
International Federation of Red Cross and Red Crescent Societies (IFRCS)
International Finance Corporation (IFC)
International Fund for Agricultural Development (IFAD)
International Hydrographic Organization (IHO)
International Labour Organization (ILO)
International Maritime Organization (IMO)
International Mobile Satellite Organization (IMSO)
International Monetary Fund (IMF)
International Olympic Committee (IOC)
International Organization for Migration (IOM)
International Organization for Standardization (ISO)
International Red Cross and Red Crescent Movement (ICRM)

International Telecommunication Union (ITU)
International Telecommunications Satellite Organization (ITSO)
International Trade Union Confederation (ITUC)
Inter-Parliamentary Union (IPU)
Latin American Economic System (LAES)
Latin American Integration Association (LAIA)
Multilateral Investment Guarantee Agency (MIGA)
Nonaligned Movement (NAM)
Organisation for the Prohibition of Chemical Weapons (OPCW)
Organization of American States (OAS)
Permanent Court of Arbitration (PCA)
Rio Group (RG)
Southern Cone Common Market (Mercosur) (associate)
Unión Latina
United Nations (UN)
United Nations Conference on Trade and Development (UNCTAD)
United Nations Educational, Scientific, and Cultural Organization (UNESCO)
United Nations High Commissioner for Refugees (UNHCR)
United Nations Industrial Development Organization (UNIDO)
United Nations Security Council
Universal Postal Union (UPU)
World Confederation of Labour (WCL)
World Customs Organization (WCO)
World Federation of Trade Unions (WFTU)
World Health Organization (WHO)
World Intellectual Property Organization (WIPO)
World Meteorological Organization (WMO)
World Tourism Organization (UNWTO)
World Trade Organization (WTO)

Law and order in Colombia 
Law of Colombia
 Animal rights in Colombia
 Constitution of Colombia
 Crime in Colombia
 Abortion in Colombia
 Cannabis in Colombia
 Domestic violence in Colombia
 Illegal drug trade in Colombia
 Kidnappings in Colombia
 Human rights in Colombia
 Children's rights in Colombia
 LGBT rights in Colombia
 Recognition of same-sex unions in Colombia
 Office of the Inspector General of Colombia
 Freedom of religion in Colombia
 Ombudsman's Office of Colombia
 Prostitution in Colombia
 Women's rights in Colombia
 National Police of Colombia

Military of Colombia 
Military of Colombia
 Command
 Commander-in-chief:
 Ministry of Defence of Colombia
 Forces
 Army of Colombia
 Navy of Colombia
 Air Force of Colombia
 Military ranks of Colombia

Local government in Colombia 

Local government in Colombia

History of Colombia

By period 
 Armero tragedy

By region 
 History of Cartagena, Colombia

By subject 
 CIA activities in Colombia
 Constitutional history of Colombia
 History of the Colombian National Police
 History of Internet in Colombia
 Postage stamps and postal history of Colombia
 Massacres in Colombia
 Military history of Colombia
 History of the Revolutionary Armed Forces of Colombia
 Paramilitarism in Colombia
 Guerrilla movements in Colombia
 Timeline of Colombian armed conflict

Culture of Colombia 
Culture of Colombia
 Architecture of Colombia
 Tallest buildings in Colombia
 Carnival in Colombia
 Cuisine of Colombia
 Colombian cuisine dishes
 Festivals in Colombia
 Humor in Colombia
 Languages of Colombia
 Media in Colombia
 Television in Colombia
 National symbols of Colombia
 Coat of arms of Colombia
 Flag of Colombia
 National anthem of Colombia
 People of Colombia
 Colombian diaspora
 Indigenous peoples in Colombia
 Minorities in Colombia
 LGBT in Colombia
 Arab diaspora in Colombia
 Prostitution in Colombia
 Public holidays in Colombia
 Scouting and guiding in Colombia
 Smoking in Colombia
 World Heritage Sites in Colombia

Art in Colombia 

Art of Colombia
 Artists of Colombia
 Cinema of Colombia
 Films of Colombia
 Colombian Academy Award winners and nominees
 Literature of Colombia
 Writers of Colombia
 Music of Colombia
 Glossary of Colombian music
 Television in Colombia
 Television series of Colombia
 Video gaming in Colombia

Religion in Colombia 
 Religion in Colombia
 Bahá'í Faith in Colombia
 Christianity in Colombia
 Roman Catholicism in Colombia
 Roman Catholic dioceses in Colombia
 Hinduism in Colombia
 Islam in Colombia

Sports in Colombia 
Sports in Colombia
 Football in Colombia
 Football clubs in Colombia
 Football stadiums in Colombia
 Colombia at the Olympics
 Rugby union in Colombia
 Underwater rugby in Colombia

Economy and infrastructure of Colombia 
Economy of Colombia
 Economic rank, by nominal GDP (2007): 40th (fortieth)
 Agriculture in Colombia
 Coca production in Colombia
 Coffee production in Colombia
 Irrigation in Colombia
 Banking in Colombia
 Bank of the Republic
 Communications in Colombia
 Internet in Colombia
 Latin America and Caribbean Network Information Centre
 Postal codes in Colombia
 Telephone numbers in Colombia
 Companies of Colombia
Currency of Colombia: Peso
ISO 4217: COP
 Energy in Colombia
 Hydroelectric power in Colombia
 Power stations in Colombia
 Health in Colombia
 Health care in Colombia
 Hospitals in Colombia
 Medicine in Colombia
 Industry of Colombia
 Mining in Colombia
 Poverty in Colombia
 Science and technology in Colombia
 Tourism in Colombia
 Transport in Colombia
 Rapid transit in Colombia
 Airports in Colombia
 Rail transport in Colombia
 Railway stations in Colombia
 Roads in Colombia
 Highways in Colombia
 Colombian Stock Exchange
 Water supply and sanitation in Colombia
 Water privatization in Colombia
 Water resources management in Colombia

Education in Colombia 
Education in Colombia
 Schools in Colombia
 Universities in Colombia

See also

Colombia

Index of Colombia-related articles
List of Colombia-related topics
Member state of the United Nations
Outline of South America

References

External links

 Government
  Portal del Estado - Colombia Online Government web site
  Presidencia de la República de Colombia - Official Presidential web site
  Ministerio de Comercio, Industria y Turismo - Commerce, Industry and Tourism Boreau
 National System of Cultural Information
  UNICEF en Colombia
 Banco de la República - Central Bank
  Departamento Administrativo Nacional de Estadistica - National Statistics Administrative Dept.
  Instituto Nacional de Vías  - Transport and Road Agency
  Senate of Colombia
  Colombia's House of representatives
  Colombia's Judicial branch
  Policia Nacional - Police
 Armada Nacional de Colombia - Navy
 Ejército Nacional de Colombia - Army
  Departamento Administrativo de Seguridad - Homeland Security
  - Agustin Codazzi Geographic Institute - Maps of Colombia

 Other
 
 Encyclopædia Britannica Colombia Country Page
 CIA World Factbook - Colombia
 US-Colombia Free Trade Deal Costly for Poor People - Oxfam

Colombia